Pet Shop of Horrors is a Japanese horror manga created by Matsuri Akino. The series focuses on the eccentric Count D, proprietor of a mysterious pet shop located in the heart of Chinatown, and the numerous patrons who visit his shop.

The manga, published by Ohzora Publishing in 10 tankōbon volumes, consists of 41 chapters in total. It has been licensed for distribution in the United States by Tokyopop. Matsuri created a sequel in 2008,  It was licensed by Tokyopop and renamed "Pet Shop of Horrors: Tokyo", but the series was dropped at 8 volumes - four volumes short of the 12 volumes it ran in Japan. In 2013 Matsuri started a spin-off prequel series called , which follows Count D's grandfather in Fin de siècle Paris. It has been irregularly published by Harlequin in their monthly comic magazine "Harlequin Original" and has been collected in 5 volumes, with no definitive ending. A second spin-off series titled  is currently being serialized in Harlequin's fantasy magazine Mugentou, starting in 2018 and collected in 3 volumes as of May 2020. It is another prequel featuring Count D's father as the protagonist.

Plot
"Count D" is the mysterious caretaker of a pet shop in Los Angeles Chinatown. Each of D's rare pets, which all have strangely humanoid appearances, comes with a contract with three major points. These points differ for each animal sold (although each animal's contract includes not showing it to anyone), and breaking this contract usually results in dire (and sometimes disturbing) consequences for the buyer, for which the pet shop claims no liability.

Individual chapters of Pet Shop of Horrors are often based on these consequences, and are each written as a stand-alone story, usually introducing one or more new characters in each chapter. With the exception of the main characters and their families, it is rare for a character to carry over to a later chapter, providing the series with a very episodic nature.

The detective Leon Orcot is used to tie the chapters together into an ongoing plot, usually in the form of a subplot within each chapter. Initially he suspects D of malicious criminal activity and using the pet shop as a front for drug trafficking. As the series progresses, he learns more about the pet shop and D himself, entering into a strange friendship of sorts with D as he works to uncover the truth.

Characters

Primary characters
Count D

Though he denies the name is "Count D" – claiming that this title belongs only to his grandfather, the shop's true owner – most humans refer to him by this name, often shortened to "The Count", "Count", or simply "D". He runs a pet shop in Chinatown while the shop's alleged true owner is traveling abroad. His motto suggests he doesn't actually sell pets but rather "love, dreams, and hope" with a three-term contract.
He appears more fond of animals than humans and displays a love of the natural world. He usually appears calm and soft-spoken (except when he is fighting with Leon), though towards the end of the manga series, his attitude changes. Because he enjoys drinking tea and has a special fondness for confectionery, Leon often bribes him with sweets and pastries in return for information. Although he often expresses disdain for humans and claims to hate human children, he eventually becomes very attached to Chris, and he also seems to hold his brother Leon in affection.
In Volume 4, Leon suspects that D may be a vampire, but D's father later refutes this (and D is actually a vegetarian). It is revealed in Volume 10 that he is not human, though what he and his family are exactly is left open to interpretation. According to D's father, they are the last of an ancient Chinese civilization that was very close to animals. Because of their wisdom, the people were kept at the imperial palace as wise men and priests. When the prince asked one of the priestesses for her hand in marriage and she refused him, however, he grew angry and ordered a massive genocide of the people. Only one man from the civilization survived, vowing to take revenge on the humans for what they did to his family. D shares a striking resemblance to his father, and to his grandfather, the real Count D. This is because they are imperfect clones ("duplicates") of one another, created to carry on Count D's legacy of revenge. They are almost identical except for the colour of their eyes; D has one purple eye, like his father, and one golden eye, inherited from his grandfather.
Leon Orcot

Leon Orcot is a hot-headed young detective who attempts to connect the pet shop with mysterious deaths in the region. He is convinced D is a criminal and proceeds to investigate him with an iron will, determined to be the one to arrest D. Over time, he forms a close and complicated relationship with D. He has a disdain for the supernatural and therefore refuses to believe D's explanations for the events of the story, though this attitude is challenged as the series progresses. He is extremely lecherous as displayed though the series, and spends a lot of time chasing girls. Over the course of the series, Leon is given two pets by D (a flowering plant and a butterfly), both of which help him through hard times in his life (as opposed to other pets sold, which are meant to teach their owners a lesson).

Other humans
Chris Orcot
Chris is Leon's much younger brother, whose mother died during childbirth. As a result, Chris was raised by his aunt and uncle, who he grew up calling "Mom" and "Dad". When Chris' younger cousin, Sam, told him that he was responsible for his mother's death, he was so shocked that he lost his ability to speak. Chris was sent to Los Angeles with Leon and spends most of his time in D's pet shop. Although he can't talk, Chris has the ability to telepathically speak to all of D's animals as well as D and Leon. As it turns out, Q-chan is the only "pet" Chris perceives as an animal. Since he initially only ever sees the animals in their human form, he believes that D actually sells human children, although he feels all right with that as long as the children don't mind it.
In Volume 10, Chris reconciles with his cousin, regains his ability to speak, and moves back to his aunt's house. This comes at the price of his loss of ability to see the animals in their humanoid forms, referred to in the manga as something of a "Departure from Eden". Twenty years later, he is shown as an FBI officer, tracking down the next generation of the Count's family. Rather than trying to arrest "New D" for the mysterious deaths caused by a pet, Chris only wishes to talk about his brother who disappeared 20 years ago. He does not seem to regard "New D" or the pet shop in an adversarial light, the way his brother Leon regarded D or Agent Howell regarded Papa D.
Jill

Jill is Leon's fellow police officer. She is far more sensible than he is as well as far more knowledgeable (for example, she learned Chinese and rattled off the life cycle of the butterfly to D). Jill seems to like D a lot and is usually exasperated by Leon's constant claims that D is a criminal.
Samantha
Commonly known as "Sam", she was four years old when Chris came to live in her household and disliked him immensely, especially when he ruined her bunny doll. She later regrets her outburst, realizing she misses him, and, with the help of Ten-chan, the two reconcile and she begins to refer to him as her "brother".
Josie
Chris' cousin and Sam's older sister. Despite Chris not being her biological brother, she has never thought of him as anything other than her little brother.

Animals
Tetsu
Often referred to as "T-chan". He is a totetsu, a mystical carnivorous animal that is a distant relative of the goat. He is a somewhat rough friend of Chris, and they are almost always together. T-chan was originally the chef of a popular Chinese restaurant, which D frequented. The two fell into a sort of 'love', D wanting to possess the rare and exotic animal, T-chan wishing to eat the vegetarian D. In the end, Leon and his police cohorts arrest T-chan as he is about to feast on D (a sacrifice D was willing to make). Later, he ripped out his heart and tried to eat it, thereby "becoming" T-Chan.
To most people, T-chan appears to be a small, primarily goat-like animal though he has the striped paws of a tiger, not hooves. To D and Chris, he takes the appearance of a grumpy young man with long messy hair and large goat horns that protrude out of his head. His fashion sense appears to be Indian or Arabic inspired. He is very quick-tempered, outspoken, and sometimes very childish. He often causes a stir whenever Detective Orcot enters the Pet Shop, often attempting to bite him the moment he enters the room.
Pon-chan
Pon-chan is a raccoon who lives at D's pet shop. She is a special friend of Chris and unlike T-chan, is very kind and friendly. To most people, Pon-chan looks like a normal raccoon. To D and Chris, she takes the form of a little girl with curly blond hair and a Victorian inspired dress. She has quite a distinct crush on Chris, and can often be jealous when he is interacting with a girl other than herself. (Due to a translation mistake many fans believe that she is a badger, because Leon refers to Pon-chan as a raccoon and D corrects him, saying that she is a European badger.)
Ten-chan
Ten-chan is a shape-shifting nine-tailed fox with a relaxed personality and a crude manner of speech. He has such a potent ability to shape-shift that he can look like several different things at the same time, depending on who's looking at him. He also has the ability to mimic the personality of whatever he's shifted into and seems to have somewhat occult powers as well. It is uncertain how he got the name "Ten-chan", since he said once that it was not his name; it may have been derived from tenko, which is the highest rank a kitsune can achieve. To most people, when he's not transformed, Ten-chan looks like a little white fox with multiple tails. To D and Chris, he takes the appearance of an androgynous, laid-back young man with long, braided hair and a flamboyant fashion sense.
"Honlon" – Shuko, Kanan and Junrei
Hatched from an egg in Volume 2, this dragon was born with three heads. In human form she appears as a little girl in traditional Asian clothing with three distinct personalities. The triplets are: Shuko, the responsible one; Kanan, the violent one; and Junrei, the childish one. Each one of them had taken on the personality of the last person to hold them while still in the egg. Shuko was born 60 years ago and since then had been raised by D. Her two other sisters had hatched more recently: Kanan after being held by Leon, and Junrei after being held by a young boy (the grandchild of a Mr. Smith, to whom her egg was accidentally given). Kanan has the tendency to bully Junrei by pulling their hair. After meeting Chris, he made a contract with them, and like Pon-chan, they can get slightly jealous when he notices someone else.

D's family
D's father
Just as no one ever knows what D's true name is, D's father's name is never revealed. He is sometimes referred to in fan circles as "Papa D." He is somewhat manipulative and holds a grudge against humanity for destroying the environment and many species of animals. His own son doesn't trust him very much, even believing him capable of kidnapping Chris at one point. D's father looks almost exactly like his son (even with identical fingerprints), except that his hair is much longer and both of his eyes are purple. Like D, he is not human, but his species is not revealed.
It is known that he attended university in 1975, passing as an exchange student from Hong Kong and being occupied with research at a genetic engineering laboratory. During this time, he met a human by the name of Vesca Howell, who later abandoned his career as a medical doctor to become an FBI agent. His sole intent was to arrest D's father, as he, like Leon Orcot with the youngest D, believed him to be a criminal. However, Leon shot D's father, and D's father killed Agent Howell. In the end, D's father is reborn as a human and carried off by D's grandfather to be raised as his son.
Q-chan/D's grandfather

Q-chan is a little bat-like creature and is D's constant companion. His name seems to be  derived from the sound he makes – "kyū". He is the only creature in the shop that looks like an animal to everyone (almost all of the other animals look like strange humans to Chris and D).
After being hinted at through the series, Q-chan's true identity is revealed in the final volume as D's grandfather, and the proper holder of the title "Count" and name "D". He tells Eva Braun at the end of the first volume of the sequel series that the title of Count was received in his own grandfather's time, and is now simply the name of his store. Although we never see the name in the English translation of the series, he is often referred to in fandom as "Sofu D," "sofu" meaning "grandfather" in Japanese. Upon the end of the series, "Q-chan" reverts to his humanoid form (identical to D apart from his two golden eyes) and takes the reborn D's father to raise.
New D
An unnamed Chinese man who runs the pet shop appears at the very end of the series. He is most likely the reincarnation of D's father, though he refers to the current Count D as "father" rather than D's grandfather as father and may be yet another duplicate D. It is also possible that this "New D" is the current D's son, as Papa D's reincarnated human form was seen in volume ten of the original series to have blond hair, whereas this D has the same black hair as the other incarnations of D. Since all members of the D family are identical (except for the color of their eyes) and the manga was in black and white, it is impossible to say which D he actually is. He winds up meeting Chris Orcot (now an adult and an FBI agent) 20 years after Papa D's death. In keeping with his family's love of sweets, he invites Chris in to talk when offered some cherry tarts.

Media

Manga

Tokyopop licensed Pet Shop of Horrors for an English-language release in North America and published the series from June 17, 2003 to January 11, 2005. The series is also distributed in New Zealand and Australia by Madman Entertainment. The series is also licensed in Germany by Tokyopop Germany, in Poland by Taiga and in Russia by Comics Factory.

The sequel, Pet Shop of Horrors: Tokyo was licensed in English by Tokyopop, who has published eight volumes as of February 2011. It was discontinued at volume 8, though the Japanese series ran for 12 volumes.

Currently there are two prequel series running in Japan. Pet Shop of Horrors: Passage-Hen is set in late 19th century France, and the protagonist is the grandfather of Count D, who runs a pet shop in a shopping arcade called a Passage in French. It is infrequently published and possibly ended, though the series lacks a definitive ending. The second prequel is Pet Shop of Horrors: Ark Adrift and features Count D's father as the protagonist.

Anime television series
Madhouse produced a 4-episode anime adaptation of various chapters of the manga in March 1999. The anime first aired as a miniseries on the TBS television network (as part of their now-defunct programming block "Wonderful") before being sold on VHS and LaserDisc.

Urban Vision released the Pet Shop of Horrors anime in North America, initially across two VHS tapes (each available in either subtitled or dubbed format) in February and May 2000 respectively. It was then re-released on a single DVD video (containing all four episodes and both language options) in February 2001. Sentai Filmworks had acquired the license in October 2008, with distribution by ADV Films. However, in 2009, A.D. Vision announced that it has shut down ADV Films and distribution rights were transferred to Section23 Films, who continues to distribute titles from Sentai. It would eventually be released on DVD as a "Sentai Selects" title on January 5, 2016. In the UK, It got its DVD release via MVM on August 2, 2010.

Episodes

Reception
Carlo Santos of Anime News Network described the plot of Pet Shop of Horrors: Tokyo as "the series' greatest strength but also its weakness: the plot formula makes it easy to dish out just the right amount of human drama, but those familiar with the Pet Shop will see each twist coming—and may even find some of them to be too far-fetched." Santos also felt that the art was "not particularly horrifying," commenting that "it's clear that Akino struggles with any artwork beyond the usual range of attractive young men, fashionable women and the occasional bizarre creature." However, he commended the "well-planned" layout and pacing of the volume. Robin Brenner commented that "Pet Shop of Horrors has always been more about atmosphere than about truly surprising plots... Instead, the pleasure comes from Matsuri Akino's talent for truthful dialogue, attention to detail in the art, and a fine sense of how to portray both laughter and dread."

References

External links
  
 
 IGN.com review

1995 manga
1999 Japanese television series endings
1999 anime television series debuts
2005 manga
Anime series based on manga
Asahi Sonorama manga
Comics set in Los Angeles
Dark fantasy anime and manga
Josei manga
Madhouse (company)
Madman Entertainment manga
Mystery anime and manga
Ohzora Publishing manga
Sentai Filmworks
Television shows set in Los Angeles
TBS Television (Japan) original programming
Tokyopop titles
Wonderful (TV programming block)
Yōkai in anime and manga